Jhakrithan is a religious site located near Khalanga in Nepal

Worshipper will sacrifice chickens, pigeons and goats  at the temple are sacrificed there in the belief that the god will grant their wishes. A small river flows beside the temple. It is surrounded by a small forest that adherents believe is the home of the god Jhakrithan

References

Buddhist temples in Nepal